The Rogers City Formation is a geologic formation in Michigan. It preserves fossils dating back to the Devonian period.

References
 

Devonian Michigan
Devonian southern paleotemperate deposits
Middle Devonian Series